The Volga Military District (PriVO) was a military district of the Soviet Union and the Russian Federation that existed from 1918 to 1989 and 1992 to 2001.

The district headquarters was located at Kazan, Saratov and Kuibyshev (Samara) at different points in time.

History 
During the Russian Empire from 1864–1917 the Kazan Military District covered the Volga area. The Volga Military District was established on May 4, 1918 on the territory of the Kazan Military District, and included  Astrakhan, Saratov, Samara, Simbirsk and Penza Governorates, and the Ural Oblast. Subsequently, the district boundaries were repeatedly changed. In 1941 the district included the Saratov, Kuibyshev, Penza, Tambov, Voronezh areas and the Orel Oblast, Kursk and Stalingrad regions of the RSFSR. The headquarters was located at Saratov.

With the start of and during World War II five armies, 132 divisions, 65 separate regiments, and 253 separate battalions were formed in the area. Polish and Czechoslovak military units were formed on the territory of the district.

In October 1945 the 123rd Rifle Corps was at Kuibyshev. It became the 40th Rifle Corps in 1955 and then the 40th Army Corps in 1957, before disbanding in 1960.

On September 14, 1954 in the Totskoye range north of the village Totskoye in the Orenburg Oblast (within the specified period the territory of the Orenburg region belonged to the South Urals Military District) under the leadership of Marshal of the Soviet Union Georgy Zhukov was conducted the Totskoye nuclear exercise with real nuclear weapons. In this doctrine, which were worked out operational issues combined arms attack, was attended by about 45,000 soldiers.

From 1957 to 1960 the 110th Motor Rifle Division was part of the 40th Army Corps of the District.

By a decree of the Presidium of the Supreme Soviet on 15 January 1974 for their contributions to strengthening the defence capability of the USSR and its armed defence, the Volga and Ural Military Districts were awarded the Order of the Red Banner.
By 1983, the Volga Military District included the territory of the Kuibyshev, Saratov, Ulyanovsk, Penza and Orenburg Oblasts, Tatar, Bashkir, Chuvash, Mari, and Mordovian ASSR. The district headquarters was located in Kuibyshev.

The following military units and formations were part of the district during the late 1980s.
43rd Training Motor Rifle Division (Kuibyshev)
213th Motor Rifle Division (Totskoye)  
96th Motor Rifle Division (Mobilization) (Kazan)  
130th Motor Rifle Division (Mobilization) (Kuibyshev)
238th Rear Defence Division (Mobilization) (Kuibyshev)
249th Reserve Motor Rifle Division (Mobilization) (Yoshkar-Ola)
256th Reserve Motor Rifle Division (Mobilization) (Kuibyshev)
274th Reserve Motor Rifle Division (Mobilization) (Kryazh)
73rd Reserve Tank Division (Mobilization) (Kazan)
74th Reserve Tank Division (Mobilization) (Ulyanovsk)
112th Anti-Aircraft Artillery Division (Mobilization) (Donguz)

The district's air forces included the Orenburg Higher Military Aviation School of Pilots and the Saratov Higher Military Aviation School of Pilots.

In 1989 the district was merged with the Ural Military District to become the Volga–Ural Military District (PURVO). It was split in 1992 and then the two districts were merged again in 2001.

Commanders
1918–1919: Ivan Mezhlauk
1924–1927: Alexander Sedyakin
1931–1932: Boris Shaposhnikov
1932–1933: Ivan Fedko
1933–1937: Pavel Dybenko
1937: Marshal Mikhail Tukhachevsky
1937: Mikhail Grigoryevich Yefremov
1938–1939: Kirill Meretskov
1939-1940: Trifon Shevaldin 
1940–1941: Vasyl Herasymenko
1941-1944: Stepan Kalinin
1944-1945: Mikhail Khozin
1945-1946: Vasily Gordov
1946-1950: Vasily Yushkevich
1953-1957: Vasily Kuznetsov
1957-1960: Vladimir N. Komarov 
1960-1961: Andrei Stuchenko
1961-1963: Ivan G. Pavlovsky 
1963-1965: Nikolai Lyashchenko 
1965-1968: Nikolai Ogarkov 
1968-1971: Aleksey M. Parshikov 
1971-1975: Yuri A. Naumenko 
1975-1977: Pyotr Lushev 
1977-1981: Vladimir N. Conchis 
1981-1985: Anatoly Y. Ryakhov
1985-1989: V. A. Patrikaev 
1989-1991: Albert Makashov
1991-2001: Anatoly Sergeyev

References

Bibliography 

Military districts of the Russian Federation
Military districts of the Soviet Union
Military units and formations established in 1918
Military units and formations disestablished in 2001
Military units and formations awarded the Order of the Red Banner